ACRIA (formerly AIDS Community Research Initiative of America) is a New York City–based non-profit and community-based AIDS service organization whose mission statement "envisions a world where all people with HIV receive the treatment, care, and support they need to lead healthy, productive lives and where new transmissions of the virus have been eliminated."


History
Founded in 1991 to provide community based clinical drug trials for people living with AIDS.  They also run the HIV Health Literacy Program (HHLP).  ACRIA can trace their history back to the founding of the Community Research Initiative by Michael Callen and Joseph Sonnabend.

Today, through its Behavioral Research Program it studies the lives and needs of people with or at risk for HIV; and through its HIV Health Literacy Program offers critical HIV healthcare education to HIV-positive people and their caregivers.They provide various consulting services (technical assistance, monitoring and evaluation, curriculum development, and web-based learning among them) to strengthen AIDS and other service organizations to better serve their own clients.

Additionally, through the ACRIA Center on HIV & Aging, the organization is recognized as an international authority on the emerging issue of older adults and HIV.

References

External links
 ACRIA Official website

HIV/AIDS prevention organizations
HIV/AIDS research organisations
Organizations established in 1991
1991 establishments in New York City